A coarb, from the Old Irish comarbae (Modern Irish comharba, Latin: hērēs), meaning "heir" or "successor", was a distinctive office of the medieval church among the Gaels of Ireland and Scotland. In this period coarb appears interchangeable with "erenach", denoting the episcopally nominated lay guardian of a parish church and headman of the family in hereditary occupation of church lands. The coarb, however, often had charge of a church which had held comparatively high rank in pre‐Norman Ireland, or one still possessed of relatively extensive termon lands.

Also as per this article "... such lucrative monastic offices as “coarb” (comarbae “heir” to a saint) or “erenach” (airchinnech “superior”), otherwise transmitted by natural or nepotic descent within ecclesiastical families, which were often the politically displaced branches of royal dynasties"

The coarb of Columba
In medieval Ireland and Scotland, the coarb of St Columba (Medieval Gaelic comarba Coluim Chille) identified the abbots who succeeded Columba. When the monks fled to their monastery in Kells, following the 9th-century Viking raids on Iona, their abbot continued to hold the title of coarb to reflect his direct inheritance: many of the early abbots were members of Columba's family.

The abbot of the collegiate church (i.e., monastery following the Rule of St Columba), who held holy orders and celebrated Mass ('serveth the cure'), was responsible for his monastic community. In time, the pattern of a Bishop and an Abbot of Iona was established, which after the Reformation and the Dissolution of the Monasteries fell into disuse.

References

Medieval occupations
Christianity in medieval Ireland
Christianity in medieval Scotland
Religious leadership roles
Local Christian church officials